Kermit Gordon (July 3, 1916 – June 21, 1976) was Director of the United States Bureau of the Budget (now the Office of Management and Budget) (December 28, 1962 – June 1, 1965) during the administration of John F. Kennedy. He continued to serve in this capacity in the Lyndon Johnson administration. He oversaw the creation of the first budgets for Johnson's Great Society domestic agenda. Gordon was a member of the Council of Economic Advisors, 1961-1962. After he retired from government service, he joined the Brookings Institution, first as vice president (1965–1967) and then as its president for nearly a decade (1967–1976). During his tenure, Brookings developed a left-of-center reputation chiefly because Gordon was a supporter of the Great Society and critic of the Vietnam War.

Born in Philadelphia, Pennsylvania, Gordon graduated from Upper Darby High School in 1933.  He was inducted into Upper Darby High School's Wall of Fame posthumously, in 1980. After graduating from Swarthmore College in 1938, he was a Rhodes Scholar (1938–1939) and a Harvard administrative fellow. During World War II he worked in the Office of Price Administration before serving in the United States Army. After the war he was a special assistant in the Department of State's Office of Assistant Secretary of Economic Affairs until 1946, when he joined the faculty of Williams College. He was a professor of economics at Williams from 1955 until he joined the Kennedy Administration as a member of the Council of Economic Advisors.

During his time at Brookings, he served on several federal government boards including as Chairman of the Health Insurance Advisory Council (1965–1967), member of the Advisory Council on  Social Security (1968–1971), and member of the Federal Pay Board (1971–1972). He was an elected member of the American Academy of Arts and Sciences and the American Philosophical Society.

References

External links
 Brookings Institution page on Gordon's tenure
 Upper Darby High School Wall of Fame
 

|-

1916 births
1976 deaths
American Rhodes Scholars
Brookings Institution people
Directors of the Office of Management and Budget
Harvard Fellows
Lyndon B. Johnson administration personnel
Kennedy administration personnel
People from Philadelphia
Swarthmore College alumni
United States Council of Economic Advisers
Urban Institute people
Members of the American Philosophical Society